Martín Antonio Alvarado Nieves (born March 7, 1968) is a Mexican luchador, or professional wrestler best known under the ring name Súper Brazo (Spanish for "Super Arm") and is part of an extensive Alvarado wrestling family that was founded by his father Shadito Cruz and includes Alvarado's five brothers as well as a large number of third-generation wrestlers. Most of the wrestlers in the Alvarado family is using or has used a ring name with the word "Brazo" ("Arm") in it at some point in their career. Martín Alvarado has worked for a number of Mexican professional wrestling promotion, but is currently working on the Mexican Independent circuit and not permanently for one specific promotion.

Professional wrestling career
Martín Alvarado was trained by his father Shadito Cruz before making his professional wrestling career on July 7, 1983. Initially he wrestled as an enmascarado or masked character called "Frayle Pop", but lost that mask as a result of a Luchas de Apuestas, or "bet match" loss to Robin Hood and revealed that he was part of the Alvarado family. At the time it was not revealed that Robin Hood was actually a brother of Martín Alvarado, José Aarón Alvarado Nieves. A few years later he took the family ring name and became known as Súper Brazo, including the signature "Brazo" mask with the logo of a man flexing his biceps on the front of it. While his three oldest brothers had worked as "Los Brazos" and other Brazos had at times replaced one of them, Super Brazo, Brazo Cibernético (formerly Robin Hood) and Brazo de Platino work as Los Nuevo Brazos for the Universal Wrestling Association starting in 1992. Later on Súper Brazo worked for Consejo Mundial de Lucha Libre (CMLL), the world's oldest and one of Mexico's largest wrestling promotions. In CMLL he became involved in a storyline with Mr. Niebla that escalated to the point that both wrestlers put their mask on the line in a Luchas de Apuestas match. The match took place on July 16, 1995 and was won by Mr. Niebla, forcing Súper Brazo to unmask. In the years following his mask loss Súper Brazo became a regular on the Mexican Independent Circuit, especially around Mexico City, oftentimes teaming with Brazo de Platino and Brazo Cibernético until his death in 1999.

Over the years Súper Brazo became more of a "Special attraction" wrestler, brought in by a promoter for a few events but not working regularly, long term for any promotion. Súper Brazo, as well as most of the other second-generation Alvarado brothers often lost their hair in Luchas de Apuestas matches, losing to wrestlers such as Apolo Dantés, Máscara Año 2000, Villano III, Veneno, Pierroth, Jr. and others. Súper Brazo has even won the hair of his brother Brazo de Platino on at least two occasions, both times as a result of the brothers losing a  Relevos Suicidas where they were forced to fight each other as a result. On February 2, 2013 Súper Brazo and Brazo de Platino took part in another chapter in the decade long feud between the Alvarado brothers and Los Villanos as the two lost a Luchas de Apuestas to Villano III and Villano IV and was once again shaved bald. On February 17, 2013 Súper Brazo and the rest of the Alvarado family held a special show, Homenaje a Shadito Cruz ("Homage to Shadito Cruz") where he teamed up with his brother Brazo de Platino and competed in the La Copa Shadito Cruz tournament, defeating El Hijo de Fishman and El Hijo de Canek before losing to their nephews Máximo and La Máscara in the semi-finals of the tournament.

The Alvarado family

The Alvarado wrestling family spans three generations starting with Shadito Cruz followed by his 6 sons and a third-generation of wrestlers that started working in the late 1990s. Several wrestlers has used the ring name "Súper Brazo" and claimed to be related to Martín Alvarado, although in some cases the family connection is fictional. Alvarado himself confirmed that the Súper Brazo, Jr. that made his debut around 2000, is indeed a biological son, but a later "Super Brazo II" was not, but given the character by Alvarado to carry on the name. The wrestler currently known as Brazo Celestial started out in 2009 wrestling as "Super Brazo, Jr." but may not be the son of Martin Alvarado. There are cases where the sons of José Alvarado Nieves (Brazo de Plata) have used the ring names of their uncles as there was already someone working as "Brazo de Plata, Jr." It remains unconfirmed how Brazo Celestial is related to the Alvarado family, only that he indeed is a member of the family.

† = deceased

Luchas de Apuestas record

Footnotes

References

1968 births
Alvarado wrestling family
Mexican male professional wrestlers
Living people
Masked wrestlers
Professional wrestlers from Mexico City